European Voluntary Workers (EVW) was the collective name given to continental Europeans invited by the British government to work in the UK in the immediate Post-World War II period, to help people who have become homeless during the war and to support labor shortages in industry. Programs inviting staff include Balt Cygnet, which recruited Baltic women for nursing, housework and textile work. In spite of its name, Balt Cygnet also accepted applicants from the Ukraine, Poland and countries in the Balkans, among others. Later Westward Ho! which recruited men for unskilled jobs in industry.

History
The relatively high level of economic growth in the UK during the post-war period led an acute labour shortage within key sectors. EVWs were first and foremost invited in order to cover the need for low-paid and unskilled work to work in industry sections like mining, iron, textiles and steel, but also in the health system and agriculture. The majority of EVWs originated in Ukraine, Poland and Latvia. During the selection process, interviews were conducted, and medical reports were prepared. Since many of these people were displaced because of World War II, also a humanitarian element has been attributed to some of the EVW schemes. In total some 91.000 people came to the UK between 1946 and 1949 under the various EVW schemes. EVWs were initially referred to as ‘Displaced Persons’, since many of the arrivals had been displaced by World War II. This term was however replaced by ‘EVW’ due to its derogatory connotations. In 1953 the term ‘EVW’ was replaced with simply ‘Foreign Workers recruited under the Westward Ho scheme’.

Some of the schemes in place, such as Balt Cygnet, did not make any provisions for dependents. This also raises questions of the humanitarian aspirations of the British government. These schemes did however experience problems with recruitment, and the most successful scheme ‘Westward Ho!' did accommodate for both children and spouses. EVWs who came to the UK were generally paid the same wage and had the same rights as British workers. Some did however experience discrimination, especially within trades with strong trade unions. They were for instance often refused positions with more responsibility and were in some places fired before British workers in the case of redundancies. Another criticism was that some of the residents of the shelters had to live in large camps without contact with their families and the local population. A total of around 80,000 European Volunteer Workers and former displaced persons have been recruited through the Balt Cygnet and Westward Ho! programs.

See also 
 Baltic people in the United Kingdom
 Displaced persons camps in post-World War II Europe
 Immigration to the United Kingdom since 1922
 Polish migration to the United Kingdom
 Ukrainian diaspora in the United Kingdom

References

Further reading 
 L. McDowell, ‘Narratives of Family, Community and Waged Work:  Latvian European Volunteer Worker Women in Post-War Britain’, Women’s History Review, 13:1, 2004.

Economic history of the United Kingdom
Human migration
Foreign workers
Aftermath of World War II in the United Kingdom